The Catalonia autonomous basketball team is the basketball team of Catalonia. The team is not affiliated to FIBA, so only plays friendly games. Last appear was in summer 2010, in the Torneo de las Naciones. Catalonia won this tournament.

History
Catalonia started to play in 1927 a friendly game against Hindú Club of Buenos Aires, Argentina. Catalonia lost by 50–16.

From 1929 to 1936, the team played several friendly games with another European regions.

In April 1980, Catalonia plays several games against Basque Country, and other games against important teams like the Soviet Union, Czechoslovakia or Yugoslavia.

In 1992, Catalonia played a game against Croatia; Croatia won by 118-82 led with 30 points of Toni Kukoč and 21 point of Dražen Petrović. The game was played as the opening of new Olympic arena, before the special qualifying tournament that was held for European teams to allocate four extra berths.

Several years later, in 2002 Catalonia played for a second time against Croatia in Palau Sant Jordi, with a record attendance of 16,471 spectators. With players like Juan Carlos Navarro or Pau Gasol, Catalonia wins by 82–75.

In 2005, Catalonia played against  Cuba at Palau Municipal d'Esports de Badalona winning by a huge margin: 101–70.

Last Catalonia appearances were in the Torneo de las Naciones, a tournament co-organized with Galicia and Basque Country. It was played from 2008 to 2010 and Catalans won the last edition.

In 2018, the women's team returned to activity with an 83–57 win against Montenegro at Pavelló Fontajau in Girona.

Games played

Roster
This was the roster of the Catalan team for the 2010 Torneo de las Naciones.

|}
| valign="top" |
 Head coach

Legend
(C) Team captain
Club field describes pro clubduring the 2010–11 season
|}

Notable players
Pau Gasol
Marc Gasol
Juan Carlos Navarro
Rudy Fernández
Raül López
Ricky Rubio

See also
Catalonia national football team
Torneo de las Naciones

References

External links
Catalan Basketball Federation website

Basketball
Catalonia